Eduardo Jorge Favaro Carbajal (born 26 March 1963) is a Uruguayan football manager and former player who played as a forward. He is the current manager of Ecuadorian club .

Career
Favaro was born in Montevideo, and was a Nacional youth graduate. He subsequently failed to settle for a club in his entire playing career, representing mainly teams in the Uruguayan Primera División, aside from Argentinos Juniors in 1991.

Favaro retired in 1995 at the age of 32, after playing for El Tanque Sisley. He began his managerial career in 2007 with a club he also represented as a player, Racing de Montevideo. After winning the 2007 Apertura in Segunda División, he was named manager of another former club, Liverpool Montevideo.

Favaro left Liverpool in June 2011, and was appointed in charge of Fénix on 3 May 2012. On 26 June 2013, he returned to Liverpool.

Favaro moved to Ecuador in November 2015, after being appointed manager of El Nacional. He took over fellow league team Aucas on 23 December 2018, but was sacked the following 29 April.

Favaro returned to Racing on 25 September 2019, but left in the end of the season after suffering relegation. On 25 December 2020, after nearly one year without a club, he returned to Ecuador to manage Macará.

Honours
Racing Montevideo
Uruguayan Segunda División: 2007 Apertura

References

External links

1963 births
Living people
Footballers from Montevideo
Uruguayan footballers
Association football forwards
Club Nacional de Football players
Montevideo Wanderers F.C. players
Sud América players
C.A. Bella Vista players
Liverpool F.C. (Montevideo) players
Racing Club de Montevideo players
Defensor Sporting players
Rampla Juniors players
El Tanque Sisley players
Argentinos Juniors footballers
Uruguayan expatriate footballers
Uruguayan expatriate sportspeople in Argentina
Expatriate footballers in Argentina
Uruguayan football managers
Uruguayan Primera División managers
Racing Club de Montevideo managers
Liverpool F.C. (Montevideo) managers
Rampla Juniors managers
Centro Atlético Fénix managers
C.D. El Nacional managers
S.D. Aucas managers
C.S.D. Macará managers
C.D. Olmedo managers
Uruguayan expatriate football managers
Uruguayan expatriate sportspeople in Ecuador
Expatriate football managers in Ecuador